Adolfo Emilio Phillips López (December 16, 1941), is a Panamanian former professional baseball outfielder, who played in  Major League Baseball (MLB) for the Philadelphia Phillies, Chicago Cubs, Montreal Expos, and Cleveland Indians from  to .

While with the Cubs, on June 11, 1967, in the second game of a doubleheader at Wrigley Field, Phillips hit three home runs in the Cubs' 18–10 victory over the New York Mets.

References

External links

Adolfo Phillips at SABR (Baseball BioProject)

1941 births
Living people
Arizona Instructional League Cubs players
Arkansas Travelers players
Chattanooga Lookouts players
Chicago Cubs players
Cleveland Indians players
Diablos Rojos del México players
Dothan Phillies players
Magic Valley Cowboys players
Major League Baseball outfielders
Major League Baseball players from Panama
Mineros de Coahuila players
Montreal Expos players
Panama Banqueros players
Panamanian expatriate baseball players in Canada
Panamanian expatriate baseball players in Mexico
Panamanian expatriate baseball players in the United States
Philadelphia Phillies players
Portland Beavers players
Salt Lake City Angels players
Sportspeople from Panama City
Tiburones de La Guaira players
Panamanian expatriate baseball players in Venezuela
Winnipeg Whips players